Heather Corrie (born 25 July 1971 near Manchester) is a British-born slalom canoeist who competed at the international level from 1986 to 2008.

She won six medals for Great Britain in the K1 team event at the ICF Canoe Slalom World Championships with two silvers (1995, 2005) and four bronzes (1997, 1999, 2002, 2003). She also won a silver medal in the same event at the 1998 European Championships in Roudnice nad Labem. Corrie won the pre-world championship event in 2001 in Bourg-Saint-Maurice, France.

Corrie, a dual national, competed for the United States in the K1 event at the 2008 Summer Olympics in Beijing where she finished eighth. She also won the US National Championships and the Pan American Championships in the same year.

World Cup individual podiums

1 Pan American Championship counting for World Cup points

References

1971 births
American female canoeists
English female canoeists
British emigrants to the United States
Canoeists at the 2008 Summer Olympics
Living people
Olympic canoeists of the United States
Sportspeople from Manchester
Medalists at the ICF Canoe Slalom World Championships
21st-century American women